The 1873 Wigtownshire by-election was fought on 21 February 1873.  The byelection was fought due to the Succession to a peerage of the incumbent MP of the Conservative Party, Lord Garlies.  It was won by the Conservative candidate Robert Vans-Agnew.

References

1873 in Scotland
1870s elections in Scotland
Politics of Dumfries and Galloway
1873 elections in the United Kingdom
By-elections to the Parliament of the United Kingdom in Scottish constituencies